Ahmad Sukri bin Ab Hamid (born 3 May 1992) is a Malaysian professional footballer who plays for Malaysia Super League club Petaling Jaya City as a central midfielder.

Club career
Sukri began his career playing for Perak youth team. He made his senior club debut for Perak in 2014. In 2017, Sukri was loaned out to PKNP until end of season.

On 6 December 2017, Sukri signed a two-year contract with Malaysia Super League side Kelantan. Sukri made his debut for Kelantan in a 0–3 defeat to Pahang on 10 February 2018 played for 90 minutes.

On 14 February 2018, he signed back to PKNP after his contract has been terminated by Kelantan. He has been appointed as club's captain since he return to the club.

Career statistics

Club

References

External links
 

1992 births
Living people
Malaysian footballers
Perak F.C. players
PKNP FC players
Kelantan FA players
Petaling Jaya City FC players
People from Perak
Malaysia Super League players
Association football midfielders